Tyler Davis (born November 1, 2000) is an American football defensive tackle for the Clemson Tigers.

High school career 
Davis played football at Wekvia High School in Apopka, Florida. Davis was a four-star recruit coming out of high school. He committed to Clemson, turning down offers from Florida State, Miami, Georgia, Ohio State, among others.

College career
Davis was name to the first team All-ACC in the 2021 season.

References

External links
https://clemsontigers.com/sports/football/roster/tyler-davis/ Clemson Tigers bio]

2000 births
Living people
Players of American football from Florida
Sportspeople from Orange County, Florida
American football defensive tackles
Clemson Tigers football players
People from Apopka, Florida